Vice-Admiral Edmond Rollo Mainguy,  (11 May 1901 – 29 April 1979) was a senior officer in the Royal Canadian Navy.

Naval career
Mainguy was born in Victoria, British Columbia, on 11 May 1901. He attended the Royal Naval College of Canada in 1915 during the First World War. 

In 1942 he was appointed acting commodore and took command of RCN destroyers in Newfoundland, quickly followed by an appointment to Ottawa as Chief of Naval Personnel. As a part of British Pacific Fleet, Uganda took part in the Okinawa campaign.

In the post-war years Mainguy was appointed Flag Officer Pacific Coast in 1946, Flag Officer Atlantic Coast in 1948, and was the head of the commission that investigated the RCN insubordination incidents of 1949 before becoming Chief of the Naval Staff in 1951. 

Mainguy retired from the Royal Canadian Navy in 1956 as a vice-admiral. In retirement he was president of Great Lakes Shipping until 1965. He died in 1979.

Family
Mainguy married Maraquita Nichol, daughter of Walter Cameron Nichol, in 1927. Their son, Daniel Mainguy, later also reached the rank of vice-admiral, serving as Vice Chief of the Defence Staff from 1983 to 1985.

References

External links
 VAdm Mainguy Curriculum Vitae – 100 RCSCC Admiral Mainguy
RCN Mutinies and the Mainguy Report

1979 deaths
1901 births
Canadian military personnel from British Columbia
Royal Canadian Navy officers
Royal Canadian Navy personnel of World War II
Canadian admirals
Canadian Officers of the Order of the British Empire
Commanders of the Royal Canadian Navy